The King Drinks or The Bean King is a c.1638 painting by Jacob Jordaens, now in the Hermitage Museum in St Petersburg.

Its history is unknown before 18 August 1762, when it was sold at the Wirman auction in Amsterdam. It was resold at the sale of J. van der Mark's collection on August 25, 1773. By the end of the 18th century it was already in Alexander Bezborodko's collection, from which it was inherited by Nikolai Alexandrovich Kushelev-Bezborodko, who in turn left it to the Museum of the Academy of Fine Arts. It was transferred to a new canvas by the restorer Umetsky in 1905. The Museum of the Academy of Fine Arts was dissolved in 1922 and The King Drinks and most of its other works were moved to the Hermitage Museum.

Sources
 Бабина Н. П., Грицай Н. И. Фламандская живопись XVII—XVIII веков. Каталог коллекции. — СПб.: Изд-во Государственного Эрмитажа, 2005. — С. 211.

Paintings by Jacob Jordaens
Paintings in the collection of the Hermitage Museum
1638 paintings
Dogs in art
Food and drink paintings
Paintings of children